Nana Yaa Serwaa Sarpong is a Ghanaian award-winning media personality and entrepreneur who was a programs and channels manager at Crystal TV and Multimedia Group.

Education 
Nana Yaa studied at Yaa Asantewaa Girls' Senior High School in Kumasi where she developed a keen interest in the media space. She was the host of a youth talk show "Conscious Vibes" which discussed social issues and challenges impacting the lives of young people. The show grew and extended unto Fox Fm in Kumasi where she co-hosted it with Opoku Opare.

Nana Yaa Serwaa Sarpong holds a joint MBA International Trade degree from Anhalt University, Germany and Ghana Communication Technology University, Ghana. She also holds an LLB Laws Degree from Mountcrest University College, Ghana. Nana Yaa possesses a BSc. Business Administration Degree from the University of Ghana Business School and a Chartered Postgraduate Diploma in Marketing from CIM UK.

Career 
She started her career at Fontonfrom TV in 1999 and moved on to manage multiple TV stations like the three Crystal TV FTA Channels and Multimedia Group's Cine Afrik, 4Kids, The Jesus Channels, Joy prime until 2019.

In 2011, Nana Yaa Serwaa Sarpong joined Multimedia Group Ltd as Channel Manager of three brands; Cine Afrik, The Jesus Channel and Ghana's ground breaking Children Channel, 4KIDS Channel and she won several awards for these brands. All three Channels eventually merged into Joy Prime Channel, which she set up and managed since March 2015. Here, she took her television career and her zeal to impact lives to a whole new level. Joy Prime fast became one of Africa's most loved Television brands, reaching millions of homes across Africa. Under her able Management, Joy Prime birthed several programs that caters to the distinctive needs of every member of the family. Her Channels were nominated for several Awards and won over 14 Awards recognising the channels’ Brand Strength, Programs, Partnerships with key Events in Ghana. She led and managed several international relationships for the Multimedia Group including partnerships with International Studios such as the BBC, Endemol / Shine, Sony, MTV, Cote Ouest, Go Quest Media, amongst others before her departure in September 2019.

She is now into consultancy and management of her NGO, League of Extraordinary Women. Nana Yaa Serwaa Sarpong is the owner and chief executive officer for Elohay Group, A company which specialises in Trade, Business Process Outsourcing, Management of Media Platforms, PR, Branding & Advertising and Events Management. She provides strategic direction and fostering of B 2 B Partnerships to the Group's Investments in Media, Telecoms & Technology, FMCG, Logistics, Agriculture, and Real Estate.

Awards 

 2016 Kids Choice Awards.
 2020 she was honoured with Media Personality of the Year Award by the Ghana Leadership Awards.
 2022 she was honoured with the Marketing and Communication Practioneer by FortyUnder40 Awards.
 2021She was honored and recognized for her humanitarian work and support by the Humanitarian Awards Global.

References 

Ghanaian journalists
Ghanaian women journalists
Living people
Yaa Asantewaa Girls' Senior High School alumni
1983 births